Beate Clausdatter Bille (30 April 1526 – 18 October 1605) was a Danish noblewoman, a member of the royal court, Chief Lady-in-Waiting (corresponding to Mistress of the Robes in the UK) to Queen Sophie from 1584 to 1592, the wife of statesman Otte Brahe, and a feudal fiefholder in her own right following the death of her husband. She succeeded her sister-in-law Inger Oxe, who held the office from 1572 to 1584, as chief lady-in-waiting to Queen Sophie. Beate Bille was the mother of astronomers Tycho Brahe and Sophia Brahe.

Biography
Born at Skarhult Castle into the powerful and ancient noble Bille family, at 18 years old she married Otte Brahe of Knutstorp Castle, a member of the equally powerful noble Brahe family. Her husband held substantial fiefdoms. After his death in 1571, Beate Bille kept the fiefdom of Froste in Scania and Vissenbjerg Birk on Funen until 1575, and  fief in Scania until 1592.

She was also noted as a supporter of the arts.

Her children included Steen Ottesen Brahe, as well as Tycho Brahe and Sophia Brahe.

References

Literature
Danmarks Adels Aarbog VII, 1890 67.
W. Mollerup og Fr. Meidell, Billeættens historie 1, 1893

Court of Frederick II of Denmark
Danish ladies-in-waiting
17th-century Danish nobility
Beate Clausdatter
Brahe family
1526 births
1605 deaths
16th-century Danish people
17th-century Danish people